The Skeireins is the second-longest known surviving text in the Gothic language, after Ulfilas' version of the Bible. It consists of eight fragments of a commentary on the Gospel of John which is commonly held to have originally extended over seventy-eight parchment leaves. It owes its title to the 19th-century German scholar Hans Ferdinand Massmann, who was the first to issue a comprehensive and correct edition of it: "Skeireins" means "explanation" in Gothic. The manuscript containing the Skeireins text is a palimpsest.

Currently it is housed at the Vatican Library (Vat. lat. 5750) in Rome.

There are conflicting views on whether the Skeireins was written directly in Gothic by a native speaker or whether it was a translation from a Greek original. Schäferdiek (1981) observes striking similarities between the Gothic of the Skeireins and the Greek of Theodore of Heraclea's commentary on the Gospel of John.

See also 
 Gothic Bible
 Gothic language
 Codex Carolinus

References

External links 
 
 
 Manuscripts of the Gothic Bible
 Full text and multiple translations of the Skeireins

6th-century biblical manuscripts
Gothic Bible
Palimpsests
Gospel of John
Manuscripts of the Vatican Library